Lithuanian Sports University or LSU is a university in Kaunas, Lithuania, specializing in sports, physical activities, and physiology. It is headquartered in Žaliakalnis neighbourhood, in close proximity to the Kaunas Sports Hall and the S. Darius and S. Girėnas Stadium.

History
LSU traces its origins back to 1934 when the President of Lithuania, Antanas Smetona, established the Higher Courses of Physical Education or HCPE offering a higher education degree. The HCPE were founded with the idea of combining the subjects of physical exercises and military training so that the graduates would be able to teach these subjects in gymnasiums. In 1938, HCPE were closed and their function was taken over by the Department of Physical Education established at Vytautas Magnus University.

In 1945, the Lithuanian State Institute of Physical Education was founded as an independent institution. It was located in the former palace of Physical Education Base and has got the main stadium with couple of football pitches, sports hall, tennis and basketball courts. In the first year, 100 students were enrolled at the Institute. 
In 1999, the Institute was renamed the Lithuanian Academy of Physical Education ( or LKKA) by a resolution of the Parliament of Lithuania (Seimas).

Since its foundation, the University has prepared about 16,000 physical education teachers, a variety of highly qualified sports coaches, physical therapy specialists, tourism and sports managers, etc. Many famous scientists, coaches and the world-famous public figures were graduated from the University. Many distinguished scholars, world-known coaches, prominent sports and public figures have graduated from the Academy. A great number of LSU graduates have become champions and prize-winners of the Olympic Games, world and European championships, among them are the twice European boxing champion Algirdas Šocikas, the winner of the Olympic gold medal and world basketball champion Modestas Paulauskas, the winners of the Olympic gold medals Valdemaras Chomičius, Rimantas Kurtinaitis, and Virgilijus Alekna.

In 2012, the Parliament of Lithuania including Education, Science and Culture Committee unanimously approved that the name of Lithuanian Academy of Physical Education is changed to The Lithuanian Sports University. 
2014 the University celebrated its 80th anniversary.

University structure
The University consists of 2 faculties:   
   Faculty of Sport Biomedicine 
   Faculty of Sport Education 
4 departments
   Department of Applied Biology and Rehabilitation
   Department of Coaching Science
   Department of Health, Physical and Social Education
   Department of Sport Management, Economics and Sociology
2 institutes
   Institute of Sport Science and Innovations
   National Wellness Institute
4 centers
   Career and Competence Development Centre
   Sports and Leisure Centre
   European Basketball Research Centre

Studies
The University offers 20 study programmes: eight undergraduate programmes at Bachelor level (including three international programmes in English), ten Master and two Doctoral study programmes. Several sports clubs are set up at the university, including football club LKKA ir Teledema Kaunas, basketball club Viktorija and LSU-Baltai, handball, weightlifting, volleyball, and other clubs.

Undergraduate (Bachelor's degree) studies:
 European Bachelor in Physical Activity and Lifestyle
 Sports Coaching
 Physiotherapy

Graduate (Master's degree) studies:
 Physiotherapy
 International Master in Performance Analysis of Sport
 Tourism and Sports Management
 Master of Science in International Basketball Coaching and Management
 Physical Activity and Public Health

Doctoral (PhD degree) studies:
 Biomedical Sciences: Biology
 Social Sciences: Education

The LSU has academic exchange agreements with over 80 European universities and holds active memberships in 14 international organisations and networks. Every year the university sends and receives increasing numbers of students and teachers through in the framework of such academic mobility programmes as Erasmus+ and Nordplus.

Science 

University's Laboratories constantly tests Lithuanian athletes and provides scientifically based recommendations, in order to improve their workout process. Research and experimental development activities are carried out in four departments of the University, in Sports Science and Innovations Institute and also, in The European research center of basketball. 
Lithuanian Sports University constantly creating and providing study programmes for all three cycles as well as continuous education programmes based on the latest research and technologies.

Organization and administration of scientific activities, research planning, execution and reporting are determined by the Regulations of Scientific Activities of Lithuanian Sports University.

LSU Strategic areas of research:
 Exercise Physiology and Genetics
 Brain and Skeletal Muscles
 Health Enhancing Physical Activity and Education through Sport
 Management and Economics of Sports Industry
 Methodology of Sports and Exercise Training

In all aspects of the research process and preparation of scientist, University cooperating not only with Lithuanian, but also with European Universities and scientists, including University of Worcester, University of Aberdeen and Karolinska Institutet.

The university publishes three scientific journals:
 "Baltic Journal of Sport and Health Sciences" 
 "Reabilitacijos mokslai" ("Rehabilitation Sciences") 
 Online journal "Laisvalaikio tyrimai" ("Leisure Time Research")

Sports 

Almost all sports included into the programme of Olympic Games are trained at the Lithuanian Sports University.

LSU available sports:

 Basketball
 Football
 Handball 
 Volleyball 
 Track-and-field athletics 
 Swimming 
 Sport aerobics 
 Judo 
 Boxing
 Rugby
 Kayak and canoeing
 Sailing
 Cycling
 Orienteering 
 Dancing
 Wheelchair basketball team

LSU is an important centre of sports science, the fosterer of physical education, sport values and traditions.
LSU has gained respect in a wide range of sports games in different Lithuanian championships. Basketball players  have become winners in numerous Lithuanian championships  as well as handballers, volleyballers, footballers are also famous for their sports results.

Alumni
 Virgilijus Alekna, Olympic discus throwing champion;
 Valdemaras Chomičius, Olympic basketball champion;
 Rimas Kurtinaitis, Olympic basketball champion;
 Modestas Paulauskas, Olympic basketball champion;
 Gintarė Scheidt, Olympic silver medalist in sailing;
 Birutė Šakickienė, Olympic bronze medalist in rowing;
 Algirdas Šocikas, European boxing champion.
 Stanislovas Stonkus, Olympic silver medalist in basketball
 Justinas Lagunavičius, Olympic silver medalist in basketball

References

External links
 Lithuanian Sports University website

Lithuanian Sports University
Education in Kaunas
Buildings and structures in Kaunas
Sport in Kaunas
Educational institutions established in 1934
Sports academies
1934 establishments in Lithuania
Sports universities and colleges